A Relief depicting a Roman legionary is located in the Pergamonmuseum and belongs to the Antikensammlung Berlin. The relief was created at the end of the first century AD and was discovered in 1800 at Pozzuoli.

The relief is 159 cm high and 86 cm wide and is made of grey-blue marble. It depicts a Roman Praetorian, a member of the Roman elite forces and bodyguard of the Emperor. He wears a Tunica with the Paenula  (a cone-shaped cloak made of linen or wool) over it. The tunica is pulled up to knee height by a belt (cingulum), part of which can be seen poking out from under the paenula. He carries a small shield, called a parma, under his left arm and his sword hangs over his shoulder on the other side. In his hand he holds a short javelin.

The praetorian is carved from the background in very high relief. The left edge of the frame had to be restored, but the right and upper edges mostly survive in the original. The relief probably belonged to a triangular base. Sculpture on display in the University Museum of Philadelphia might be fragments of the other two sides. On one of these another praetorian is depicted and on the third there are two legionaries from the northern auxiliaries. It is suggested that this base supported an equestrian statue of the Emperor Domitian, which would have been reworked into a Triumphal arch for Trajan at Puteoli after Domitian's death and damnatio memoriae. The relief was found at Puteoli in 1800 and acquired for Berlin at Rome in 1830.

Bibliography 
 Max Kunze. "Relief mit der Darstellung eines römischen Legionärs" in Staatliche Museen zu Berlin. Preußischer Kulturbesitz. Antikensammlung (Ed.): Die Antikensammlung im Pergamonmuseum und in Charlottenburg. von Zabern, Mainz 1992, p. 224.
 Relief of a Roman warrior. in Königliche Museen zu Berlin (Alexander Conze (ed)). Beschreibung der antiken Skulpturen mit Ausschluss der pergamenischen Fundstücke. Spemann, Berlin 1891, pp. 358–359. (Inventory no. 887)

References 

Archaeological discoveries in Italy
1st-century Roman sculptures
Marble sculptures in Germany
Roman legionary
1800 archaeological discoveries
Sculptures of men in Germany
Classical sculptures of the Berlin State Museums